The 1995–96 St. John's Red Storm men's basketball team represented St. John's University during the 1995–96 NCAA Division I men's basketball season. The team was coached by Brian Mahoney in his fourth year at the school. St. John's home games are played at Alumni Hall and Madison Square Garden and the team is a member of the Big East Conference.

Off season

Departures

Class of 1995 signees

Roster

Schedule and results

|-
!colspan=9 style="background:#FF0000; color:#FFFFFF;"| Regular season

|-
!colspan=9 style="background:#FF0000; color:#FFFFFF;"| Big East tournament

References

St. John's Red Storm men's basketball seasons
St. John's
St John
St John